Black Air is a fictional former Governmental Intelligence department appearing in American comic books published by Marvel Comics. It is depicted as founded and operating primarily within the United Kingdom, initially as an adjunct to the Ministry of Defence.  It was introduced, along with Pete Wisdom,  in Excalibur #86 (Feb. 1995), and was created by Warren Ellis.

Fictional organization history
Black Air, as a covert, secretive Intelligence department, is mandated with the investigation into and research of supernatural and paranormal phenomena, at first alongside, and then replacing another British Intelligence department, the Weird Happenings Organization (aka W.H.O, an homage to the UK sci-fi series, Doctor Who).  Black Air uses the W.H.O's old links to the super-team Excalibur to send them to investigate a civil uprising in Genosha, with particular reference to anti-mutant ammunition.  Field agent Pete Wisdom is sent along as Black Air's representative.  It transpires that the entire mission is in fact a ruse; Black Air sent the mission simply to cause a commotion, that they might use this to their advantage, accessing whatever technologies or information were revealed by the investigation.

Following that mission, Wisdom takes Excalibur member Kitty Pryde with him to investigate the death of an old friend, ultimately leading him to "Dream Nails", a codenamed Black Air facility which had dealt with xenobiological specimens, such as a race known as the Uncreated.  These creatures had been experimented on within the facility to create Blood Eagle, a psychoactive virus that would consume the flesh of the host if they experienced any stressful emotion.  Ultimately, Wisdom and Pryde destroy the Dream Nails facility.

Soon after this, several Black Air agents showed up in County Mayo, Ireland, to investigate the disappearance of Cassidy Keep and encountered members of Generation X.

Later, in a bid to seize control of the country, Black Air allies themselves with the London Branch of the Hellfire Club, an ancient "gentleman's club" devoted to power through non-traditional means, in order to both bribe the British Parliament, and raise an ancient demon from its crypt below London.  The aim is to release it onto the streets, hoping to use the ensuing chaos to their advantage.  Douglock, the being composed of Warlock and Cypher was to be used as the conduit to the crypt.  Wisdom and Excalibur are able to enter "The Blackwall", Black Air's HQ, and sever the link, rescuing Douglock, destroying the Blackwall and stopping the resurrection.

Black Air survive this loss of political and actual power, albeit in a much-reduced manner, operating only through a handful of splinter cells.  One of these cells sends Sari St. Hubbins, a contract killer, to kill her former lover Peter Wisdom; simultaneously, they are responsible for the kidnapping and sale to extraterrestrials of Nightcrawler.

When a new Excalibur, on the behalf of MI-13, surfaces as a team, Black Air make an appearance as a private-sector rival operation. As to their current aims, numbers and strength, little is known yet.

References

External links
Black Air history as part of Peter Wisdom's biography at Uncannyxmen.net
A list of Black Air appearances in the Excalibur title up to #100 at MarvelDirectory.com